Dhamaal Tv is a Hindi-language television channel based in India owned by Sri Adhikari Brothers Television Network Ltd. The channel was launched on 23 February 2014. The USP of the channel is its daily programming, with a variety of shows and movies.

Former shows 
Suraag - The Clue
Alif Laila 
Bahut Khoob
Shrimaan Shrimati
Madam Ki Paatshaala
Khauff
Bachchan Pandey Ki Toli
Galat Family
Kya Samachar Hai
Dil Se
Geet Gaata Chal
Darling I Love You
Say Na Something To... Anupam Uncle
Karam
Love Mein Kabhi Kabhi

References

Sri Adhikari Brothers Television
Hindi-language television channels in India
Television channels and stations established in 2014
Hindi-language television stations
Television channels based in Noida